Price Wallace (born November 24, 1961) is an American politician. He is a member of the Mississippi House of Representatives from the 77th District, being first elected in 2018. He is a member of the Republican Party.

In a November 7, 2020 tweet from his official Twitter account, in response to the victory of Joe Biden in the 2020 United States presidential election, Wallace called for the state of Mississippi to "succeed  from the union and form our own country." This tweet was later deleted, and Wallace apologised for posting it.

References

1961 births
Living people
Republican Party members of the Mississippi House of Representatives
21st-century American politicians